Calgoa is a locality in the Fraser Coast Region, Queensland, Australia.

History 
Calgoa Provisional School opened in February 1935 but closed on 18 April 1935. It reopened on 10 April 1938. In 1952 it became Calgoa State School. It closed in December 1953.

In the  Calgoa had a population of 9 people.

References 

Fraser Coast Region
Localities in Queensland